Petra Tschetsch (also known as Petra Tschetsch-Hiltensberger) is a former German curler.

She is a former European champion and European mixed champion (2013).

Teams

Women's

Mixed

References

External links
 

Living people
1960 births
German female curlers
European curling champions
German curling champions